In mathematics, a Thue equation is a Diophantine equation of the form

ƒ(x,y) = r,

where ƒ is an irreducible bivariate form of degree at least 3 over the rational numbers, and r is a nonzero rational number. It is named after Axel Thue who in 1909 proved a theorem, now called Thue's theorem, that a Thue equation has finitely many solutions in integers x and y.

The Thue equation is solvable effectively: there is an explicit bound on the solutions x, y of the form  where constants C1 and C2 depend only on the form ƒ.   A stronger result holds, that if K is the field generated by the roots of ƒ then the equation has only finitely many solutions with x and y integers of K and again these may be effectively determined.

Finiteness of solutions and diophantine approximation
Thue's original proof that the equation named in his honour has finitely many solutions is through the proof of what is now known as Thue's theorem: it asserts that for any algebraic number  having degree  and for any  there exists only finitely many co-prime integers  with  such that . Applying this theorem allows one to almost immediately deduce the finiteness of solutions. However, Thue's proof, as well as subsequent improvements by Siegel, Dyson, and Roth were all ineffective.

Solving Thue equations
Solving a Thue equation can be described as an algorithm ready for implementation in software. In particular, it is implemented in the following computer algebra systems:
 in PARI/GP as functions thueinit() and thue().
 in Magma computer algebra system as functions ThueObject() and ThueSolve().
 in Mathematica through Reduce

Bounding the number of solutions to Thue equations

While there are several effective methods to solve Thue equations (including using Baker's method and Skolem's -adic method), these are not able to give the best theoretical bounds on the number of solutions. One may qualify an effective bound  of the Thue equation  by the parameters it depends on, and how "good" the dependence is. The most significant qualitative improvement to the theorem of Bombieri and Schmidt is due to Stewart, who obtained a bound of the form  where  is a divisor of  exceeding  in absolute value. It is conjectured that one may take the bound ; that is, depending only on the degree of  but not its coefficients, and completely independent of the integer  on the right hand side of the equation. This is a weaker form of a conjecture of Stewart, and is a special case of the uniform boundedness conjecture for rational points. This conjecture has been proven for "small" integers , where smallness is measured in terms of the discriminant of the form , by various authors, including Evertse, Stewart, and Akhtari. Stewart and Xiao demonstrated a strong form of this conjecture, asserting that the number of solutions is absolutely bounded, holds on average (as  ranges over the interval  with )

See also
 Roth's theorem

References

Further reading
 

Diophantine equations
Theorems in number theory